Ved kongelunden... is a 1953 Danish comedy film directed by Poul Bang and starring Dirch Passer.

Cast
 Dirch Passer - Konduktør Svendsen
 Ove Sprogøe - Vognstyrer Iversen
 Louis Miehe-Renard - Jørgen Rasmussen
 Birgit Sadolin - Annemarie Olsen (as Birgit Møller-Petersen)
 Henry Nielsen - Murer Jens Rasmussen
 Inger Lassen - Fru Emma Rasmussen
 Betty Helsengreen - Fru Olga Olsen
 Buster Larsen - Knud Hansen
 Kate Mundt - Anna
 Verner Thaysen - Ingeniør Valter Bruun
 Ib Schønberg - Tjener Olsen
 Knud Schrøder - Værkfører Jørgensen (uncredited)

External links

1953 films
Danish-language films
1953 comedy films
Danish black-and-white films
Films directed by Poul Bang
Films scored by Sven Gyldmark
Danish comedy films